The 1981–82 season was the 67th season of the Isthmian League, an English football competition.

Leytonstone & Ilford were champions, winning their first Isthmian League title two years after merging. There was no promotion from the Isthmian League to the Alliance Premier League till 1985. Bognor Regis Town were transferred from the Southern Football League and won promotion to the Premier Division at the first attempt. Camberley Town left the league at the end of the season.

Premier Division

The Premier Division consisted of 22 clubs, including 20 clubs from the previous season and two new clubs, promoted from Division One:
Billericay Town
Bishop's Stortford

League table

Division One

Division One consisted of 21 clubs, including 18 clubs from the previous season and three new clubs:

Bognor Regis Town, transferred from Southern Football League Southern Division
Feltham, promoted as champions of Division Two
Hornchurch, promoted as runners-up in Division Two

League table

Division Two

Second Division consisted of 21 clubs, including 17 clubs from the previous season and four new teams:

Two clubs relegated from Division One:
Camberley Town
Finchley

Two clubs joined from the Athenian League:
Basildon United
Windsor & Eton

League table

References

Isthmian League seasons
I